Billy Evans (born 19 October 1996) is a former professional Australian rules footballer who played for the Brisbane Lions in the Australian Football League (AFL).

Evans played for the Bendigo Pioneers in the TAC Cup and represented Victoria Country at the 2014 AFL Under 18 Championships.  He attended Catholic College Bendigo.

Evans was drafted by the Brisbane Lions with their first selection and the fourth overall in the 2015 AFL rookie draft. He made his debut in the fourteen point loss against  in round 19, 2015 at the Gabba. After seven matches with Brisbane, He was delisted at the conclusion of the 2016 season.

Statistics

|- style="background-color: #EAEAEA"
! scope="row" style="text-align:center" | 2015
|
| 46 || 5 || 1 || 2 || 17 || 40 || 57 || 9 || 14 || 0.2 || 0.4 || 3.4 || 8.0 || 11.4 || 1.8 || 2.8
|-
! scope="row" style="text-align:center" | 2016
|
| 46 || 2 || 0 || 0 || 6 || 14 || 20 || 4 || 8 || 0.0 || 0.0 || 3.0 || 7.0 || 10.0 || 2.0 || 4.0
|- class="sortbottom"
! colspan=3| Career
! 7
! 1
! 2
! 23
! 54
! 77
! 13
! 22
! 0.1
! 0.3
! 3.3
! 7.7
! 11.0
! 1.9
! 3.1
|}

References

External links 

1996 births
Living people
Brisbane Lions players
Bendigo Pioneers players
Australian rules footballers from Victoria (Australia)